1-Bromonaphthalene is an organic compound with the formula C10H7Br.  It is one of two isomeric bromonaphthalenes, the other being 2-bromonaphthalene. Under normal conditions, the substance is a colorless liquid.

Synthesis and reactions
It is prepared by treatment of naphthalene with bromine:

C10H8  +  Br2   →   C10H7Br  +  HBr

The compound exhibits many reactions typical of aryl bromides.  Bromide can be displaced by cyanide to give the nitrile.  It forms a Grignard reagent and organolithium compound.  1-Lithionaphthalene can be further lithiated to give 1,8-dilithionaphthalene, a precursor to peri-naphthalene compounds.

Applications
Because of its high refractive index (1.656-1.659nD), 1-bromonaphthalene is used as an embedding agent in microscopy and for determining the refraction of crystals.

The compound is also used as a precursor to various substituted derivatives of naphthalene.

See also
1-Chloronaphthalene
1-Fluoronaphthalene

References

Bromoarenes
1-Naphthyl compounds